Escape Island is an island near Jurien Bay in Western Australia.

Description

Lighthouse

Geology
The islands were formed approximately 10,000 years ago after large fluctuations in sea levels caused erosion on large areas of the continental shelf during periods of glaciation. Large parallel sand dunes then formed and hardened into limestone, forming islands, most of which have been separated from the mainland for 6,500 years.

Well preserved Tamala limestone geological features can be found on the islands, including the fragile fossil root networks known as rhizoliths that are found on Escape Island.

Fauna
The Jurien Bay skink is found on the island, inhabiting the crevices in the limestone rocks. The bull skink is also found but lives in shallow burrows in the sandy soil. King's skinks are also found on the island but tend to inhabit the petrel burrows that are also found on the island.

In 1999, 40 dibblers that were bred at Perth Zoo were released on the island under the wildlife recovery program Western Shield.

See also

 List of islands of Western Australia

References

Islands of the Mid West (Western Australia)
Nature reserves in Western Australia
Turquoise Coast (Western Australia)